Utz is a 1992 dramatic film directed by George Sluizer, produced by John Goldschmidt and starring Brenda Fricker, Peter Riegert and Armin Mueller-Stahl. Mueller-Stahl won the Silver Bear for Best Actor at the 42nd Berlin International Film Festival.

The film is based on the 1988 novel Utz by Bruce Chatwin, who also co-wrote the screenplay.

Premise
An art dealer goes to Prague after the death of a friend, Baron von Utz, to obtain the Baron's priceless Meissen porcelain collection. He meets an old friend, Orlik, who tells him about the Baron's past while he struggles to discover what happened to the collection.

Cast
 Armin Mueller-Stahl as Baron Kaspar Joachim von Utz
 Brenda Fricker as Marta
 Peter Riegert as Marius Fisher
 Paul Scofield as Doctor Vaclav Orlik
 Gaye Brown as Ada Krasova
 Miriam Karlin as Grandmother
 Pauline Melville as Curator
 Adrian Brine as Head Waiter
 Peter Mackriel as Janitor
 Caroline Guthrie as Young Marta
 Clark Dunbar as Doctor

References

External links 
Synopsis from the Washington Post

1992 films
1992 drama films
British drama films
1990s English-language films
Films directed by George Sluizer
Films set in Prague
Films based on British novels
First Run Features films
Films scored by Nicola Piovani
Films about nobility
1990s British films